American actor Ron Perlman has had an extensive career in both stage and screen since he started acting in 1975. His first television role was on the soap opera Ryan's Hope in 1979. He went on to play Vincent on the fantasy-drama series Beauty and the Beast opposite Linda Hamilton (1987–1990), which earned him a Golden Globe Award for Best Performance by an Actor in a Television Series - Drama. He also voiced Sergeant Francis Q. Grating on the animated series Bonkers (1993–1994), voiced Graft on the animated series Phantom 2040 (1994–1995), played Josiah Sanchez on the western series The Magnificent Seven (1998–2000), voiced Slade on the animated series Teen Titans (2003–2006), voiced Vice Principal Mr. Lancer on the Nickelodeon original animated series Danny Phantom (2004–2007) and he narrated the Spike anthology series 1000 Ways to Die (2008–2012). From 2008 to 2013, he co-starred as Clay Morrow on the action crime drama series Sons of Anarchy with Charlie Hunnam and Katey Sagal. He also starred in the drama series Hand of God with Dana Delany (2014–2017) and in seasons 2 and 3 of the crime drama series StartUp with Adam Brody (2017–2018).

Perlman's film work includes frequent collaborations with Mexican director Guillermo del Toro, most notably starring as the title character in the 2004 superhero film Hellboy, and it's 2008 sequel Hellboy II: The Golden Army. Perlman has also worked with del Toro on the films Cronos opposite Federico Luppi (1993), Blade II opposite Wesley Snipes (2002), Pacific Rim opposite Charlie Hunnam (2013) and Nightmare Alley with Bradley Cooper (2021). Perlman's other film roles include the 1996 science fiction horror film The Island of Dr. Moreau with Val Kilmer, 1997 science fiction horror film Alien Resurrection with Sigourney Weaver, and the 2011 sword and sorcery film Conan the Barbarian. He is set to voice Optimus Primal in the upcoming 2023 science fiction action film Transformers: Rise of the Beasts.

Film

Television

Video games

Stage

References

External links
 

American filmographies
Male actor filmographies